Will and the Kill were an American rock band from Austin, Texas.

Will and the Kill's members included Will Sexton, brother of guitarist Charlie Sexton, and David Grissom, later of Storyville. The group released one self-titled album on MCA Records in 1988, which reached #129 on the Billboard 200. A single from the album, "Heart of Steel", peaked at #28 on the Billboard Mainstream Rock Tracks chart. The album was produced by Joe Ely.

Members
Will Sexton - vocals, guitar
David Grissom - guitar
Alex Napier - bass
Jeff Boaz - drums

References

Musical groups from Austin, Texas
Rock music groups from Texas